The 2016 SWAC women's soccer tournament is the postseason women's soccer tournament for the Southwestern Athletic Conference to be held from November 3 to 6, 2016. The seven-match tournament will be held at the Prairie View A&M Soccer Stadium in Prairie View, Texas. The eight team single-elimination tournament will consist of three rounds based on seeding from regular season conference play. The Howard Lady Bison are the defending tournament champions after defeating the Alabama State Hornets in the championship match.

Bracket

Schedule

Quarterfinals

Semifinals

Final

References 
2016 SWAC Women's Soccer Championship

Southwestern Athletic Conference Women's Soccer Tournament
2016 Southwestern Athletic Conference women's soccer season